The 1975 Seton Hall Pirates baseball team represented Seton Hall University in the 1975 NCAA Division I baseball season. The Pirates played their home games at Owen T. Carroll Field. The team was coached by Mike Sheppard in his 3rd year as head coach at Seton Hall.

The Pirates won the Northeast Regional to advance to the College World Series, where they were defeated by the Texas Longhorns.

Roster

Schedule

! style="" | Regular Season
|- valign="top" 

|- align="center" bgcolor="#ffcccc"
| 1 || March 17 || at  || Unknown • DeLand, Florida || 2–9 || 0–1 || –
|- align="center" bgcolor="#ffcccc"
| 2 || March 18 || vs  || Unknown • DeLand, Florida || 7–8 || 0–2 || –
|- align="center" bgcolor="#ffcccc"
| 3 || March 20 || vs South Carolina || Unknown • DeLand, Florida || 5–6 || 0–3 || –
|- align="center" bgcolor="#ccffcc"
| 4 || March 20 || at Stetson || Unknown • DeLand, Florida || 11–4 || 1–3 || –
|- align="center" bgcolor="#ccffcc"
| 5 || March 21 || vs Miami (OH) || Unknown • DeLand, Florida || 13–8 || 2–3 || –
|- align="center" bgcolor="#ccffcc"
| 6 || March 22 || vs South Carolina || Unknown • DeLand, Florida || 4–3 || 3–3 || –
|- align="center" bgcolor="#ccffcc"
| 7 || March  || vs  || Unknown • Unknown || 8–1 || 4–3 || 1–0
|-

|- align="center" bgcolor="#ccffcc"
| 8 || April 1 || at  || Bainton Field • Piscataway, New Jersey || 20–1 || 5–3 || 1–0
|- align="center" bgcolor="#ccffcc"
| 9 || April || vs  || Unknown • Unknown || 9–4 || 6–3 || 2–0
|- align="center" bgcolor="#ccffcc"
| 10 || April  || vs  || Owen T. Carroll Field • South Orange, New Jersey || 5–4 || 7–3 || 2–0
|- align="center" bgcolor="#ffcccc"
| 11 || April  || vs  || Unknown • Unknown || 10–6 || 8–3 || 2–0
|- align="center" bgcolor="#ffcccc"
| 12 || April  || vs  || Unknown • Unknown || 6–10 || 8–4 || 2–1
|- align="center" bgcolor="#ccffcc"
| 13 || April  || vs  || Unknown • Unknown || 14–5 || 9–4 || 3–1
|- align="center" bgcolor="#ffcccc"
| 14 || April  || vs  || Unknown • Unknown || 3–5 || 9–5 || 3–2
|- align="center" bgcolor="#ccffcc"
| 15 || April  || vs  || Unknown • Unknown || 7–2 || 10–5 || 4–2
|- align="center" bgcolor="#ccffcc"
| 16 || April 13 ||  || Owen T. Carroll Field • South Orange, New Jersey || 7–5 || 11–5 || 4–2
|- align="center" bgcolor="#ffcccc"
| 17 || April 13 || Templte || Owen T. Carroll Field • South Orange, New Jersey || 0–10 || 11–6 || 4–2
|- align="center" bgcolor="#ccffcc"
| 18 || April  || vs Wagner || Unknown • Unknown || 14–5 || 12–6 || 5–2
|- align="center" bgcolor="#ccffcc"
| 19 || April  ||  || Unknown • Unknown || 15–4 || 13–6 || 6–2
|- align="center" bgcolor="#ccffcc"
| 20 || April  ||  || Unknown • Unknown || 7–5 || 14–6 || 7–2
|- align="center" bgcolor="#ccffcc"
| 21 || April  ||  || Unknown • Unknown || 24–1 || 15–6 || 7–2
|- align="center" bgcolor="#ccffcc"
| 22 || April  || St. Francis (NY) || Unknown • Unknown || 14–5 || 16–6 || 8–2
|- align="center" bgcolor="#ffcccc"
| 23 || April 20 ||  || Owen T. Carroll Field • South Orange, New Jersey || 7–8 || 17–6 || 8–3
|- align="center" bgcolor="#ccffcc"
| 24 || April  || C. W. Post || Unknown • Unknown || 10–2 || 18–6 || 9–3
|- align="center" bgcolor="#ffcccc"
| 25 || April  || Fordham || Unknown • Unknown || 7–8 || 18–7 || 9–4
|- align="center" bgcolor="#ccffcc"
| 26 || April  || Manhattan || Unknown • Unknown || 10–7 || 19–7 || 10–4
|- align="center" bgcolor="#ccffcc"
| 27 || April 27 ||  || Owen T. Carroll Field • South Orange, New Jersey || 6–4 || 20–7 || 10–4
|- align="center" bgcolor="#ccffcc"
| 28 || April  || Fairleigh Dickinson || Unknown • Unknown || 5–3 || 21–7 || 11–4
|-

|- align="center" bgcolor="#ccffcc"
| 29 || May  ||  || Unknown • Unknown || 8–3 || 22–8 || 11–4
|- align="center" bgcolor="#ccffcc"
| 30 || May 9 || at St. John's || McCallen Field • New York, New York || 1–0 || 23–8 || 11–4
|- align="center" bgcolor="#ccffcc"
| 31 || May 10 || Rutgers || Owen T. Carroll Field • South Orange, New Jersey || 10–5 || 24–8 || 11–4
|- align="center" bgcolor="#ccffcc"
| 32 || May  ||  || Unknown • Unknown || 10–3 || 25–8 || 11–4
|- align="center" bgcolor="#ccffcc"
| 33 || May  || LIU Brooklyn || Unknown • Unknown || 13–6 || 26–8 || 12–4
|- align="center" bgcolor="#ccffcc"
| 34 || May  ||  || Unknown • Unknown || 5–4 || 27–8 || 12–4
|-

|-
! style="" | Postseason
|- valign="top" 

|- align="center" bgcolor="#ccffcc"
| 35 || May  || C. W. Post || Unknown • Unknown || 9–3 || 27–8 || 12–4
|- align="center" bgcolor="#ccffcc"
| 36 || May  || Fordham || Unknown • Unknown || 6–2 || 28–8 || 12–4
|-

|- align="center" bgcolor="#ccffcc"
| 37 || May 23 || vs  || Unknown • Stamford, Connecticut || 7–5 || 29–8 || 12–4
|- align="center" bgcolor="#ccffcc"
| 38 || May 23 || vs St. John's || Unknown • Stamford, Connecticut || 5–1 || 30–8 || 12–4
|- align="center" bgcolor="#ccffcc"
| 39 || May 24 || vs  || Unknown • Stamford, Connecticut || 11–7 || 31–8 || 12–4
|-

|- align="center" bgcolor="#ffcccc"
| 40 || June 7 || vs South Carolina || Johnny Rosenblatt Stadium • Omaha, Nebraska || 1–3 || 31–9 || 12–4
|- align="center" bgcolor="#ccffcc"
| 41 || June 8 || vs Florida State || Johnny Rosenblatt Stadium • Omaha, Nebraska || 11–0 || 32–9 || 12–4
|- align="center" bgcolor="#ffcccc"
| 42 || June 9 || vs Texas || Johnny Rosenblatt Stadium • Omaha, Nebraska || 10–12 || 32–10 || 12–4
|-

Awards and honors
Rico Bellini
All-District AACBC

Rick Cerone
First Team All-American American Baseball Coaches Association
First Team All-American College Sports Information Directors of America

Ted Schoenhaus
All-District AACBC

References

1975 Metropolitan Intercollegiate Conference baseball season
Seton Hall Pirates baseball seasons
Seton Hall Pirates baseball
College World Series seasons